The Plymouth Cambridge is a full-size automobile, produced by Plymouth from 1951 until 1953. It was Plymouth's base-range base model in its 1951 and 1952 lineups, along with the shorter wheelbase Concord and the sole base model for 1953. When it was introduced, it came with new features such as electric windshield wipers and downdraft carburetors. It also had "Safe-guard" brakes, that had two hydraulic cylinders per front wheel instead of just one It replaced the Deluxe, and was replaced by the Plaza for 1954.

References

 Gunnell, John (Editor): Standard Catalog of American Cars 1946-1975, Krause Publications Inc., Iola (2002),

External links
 allpar.com Plymouth cars of 1949 to 1952
 allpar.com Plymouths of 1953 and 1954: Hy-Style and Hy-Drive; Cranbrook, Belvedere, Savoy, and Plaza

Cambridge
Rear-wheel-drive vehicles
Full-size vehicles
Cars introduced in 1951